Geography and wealth have long been perceived as correlated attributes of nations. Scholars such as Jeffrey D. Sachs argue that geography has a key role in the development of a nation's economic growth. For instance, nations that reside along coastal regions, or those who have access to a nearby water source, are more plentiful and able to trade with neighboring nations. In addition, countries that have a tropical climate face a significant amount of difficulties such as disease, intense weather patterns, and lower agricultural productivity. The correlation between geography and a nation's wealth can be observed by examining a country's GDP (gross national product) per capita, which takes into account a nation's economic output and population. 

The wealthiest nations of the world with the highest standard of living tend to be those at the northern extreme of areas open to human habitation—including Northern Europe, the United States, and Canada.  Within prosperous nations, wealth often increases with distance from the equator; for example, the Northeast United States has long been wealthier than its southern counterpart and northern Italy wealthier than southern regions of the country. Even within Africa this effect can be seen, as the nations farthest from the equator are wealthier.  In Africa, the wealthiest nations are the three on the southern tip of the continent, South Africa, Botswana, and Namibia, and the countries of North Africa.  Similarly, in South America, Argentina, Southern Brazil, Chile, and Uruguay have long been the wealthiest. Within Asia, Indonesia, located on the equator, is among the poorest. Within Central Asia, Kazakhstan is wealthier than other former Soviet Republics which border it to the south, like Uzbekistan. 

Researchers at Harvard's Center for International Development found in 2001 that only one tropical economy — Singapore — is classified as high-income by the World Bank, while all countries within regions zoned as temperate had either middle- or high-income economies.

Measurement

Most of the recent studies use national gross domestic product per person, as measured by the World Bank and the International Monetary Fund, as the unit of comparison. Intra-national comparisons use their own data, and political divisions such as states or provinces then delineate the study areas.

Explanations

Historic
One of the first to describe and assess the phenomenon was the French philosopher Montesquieu, who asserted in the 18th century that "cold air constringes (sic) the extremities of the external fibres of the body; this increases their elasticity, and favours the return of the blood from the extreme parts to the heart. It contracts those very fibres; consequently it also increases their force. On the contrary, warm air relaxes and lengthens the extremes of the fibres; of course it diminishes their force and elasticity. People are therefore more vigorous in cold climates."

The 19th century historian Henry Thomas Buckle wrote that "climate, soil, food, and the aspects of nature are the primary causes of intellectual progress—the first three indirectly, through determining the accumulation and distribution of wealth, and the last by directly influencing the accumulation and distribution of thought, the imagination being stimulated and the understanding subdued when the phenomena of the external world are sublime and terrible, the understanding being emboldened and the imagination curbed when they are small and feeble."

Cultural innovation

Physiologist Jared Diamond was inspired to write his Pulitzer Prize-winning work Guns, Germs, and Steel by a question posed by Yali, a New Guinean politician: why were Europeans so much wealthier than his people? In this book, Diamond argues that the Europe-Asia (Eurasia) land mass is particularly favorable for the transition of societies from hunter-gatherer to farming communities. This continent stretches much farther along the same lines of latitude than any of the other continents. Since it is much easier to transfer a domesticated species along the same latitude than it is to move it to a warmer or colder climate, any species developed at a particular latitude will be transferred across the continent in a relatively short amount of time. Thus the inhabitants of the Eurasian continent have had a built-in advantage in terms of earlier development of farming, and a greater range of plants and animals from which to choose.

Diamond notes that modern technologies and institutions were designed primarily in a small area of northwestern Europe. After the Scientific Revolution in Europe in the 16th century, the quality of life increased and wealth began to spread to the middle class. This included agricultural techniques, machines, and medicines.  These technologies and models readily spread to areas colonized by Europe which happened to be of similar climate, such as North America and Australia.  As these areas also became centres of innovation, this bias was further enhanced. Technologies from automobiles to power lines are more often designed for colder and drier regions, since most of their customers are from these regions.

The book goes on to document a feedback effect of technologies being designed for the wealthy, which makes them more wealthy and thus more able to fund technological development.  He notes that the far north has not always been the wealthiest latitude; until only a few centuries ago, the wealthiest belt stretched from Southern Europe through the Middle East, northern India and southern China.  A dramatic shift in technologies, beginning with ocean-going ships and culminating in the Industrial Revolution, saw the most developed belt move north into northern Europe, China, and the Americas.  Northern Russia became a superpower, while southern India became impoverished and colonized.  Diamond argues that such dramatic changes demonstrate that the current distribution of wealth is not due to immutable factors such as climate or race, citing the early emergence of agriculture in ancient Mesopotamia as evidence.

Diamond also notes the feedback effect in the growth of medical technology, stating that more research money goes into curing the ailments of northerners.

Disease

Ticks, mosquitos, and rats, which continue to be important disease vectors, benefit from warmer temperatures and higher humidities. There has long been a malarial belt spanning the equatorial portions of the globe; the disease is especially deadly to children under the age of five. Notably it has been almost impossible for most forms of northern livestock to thrive due to the endemic presence of the tsetse fly.

Jared Diamond has linked domestication of animals in Europe and Asia to the development of diseases that enabled these countries to conquer the inhabitants of other continents. The close association of people in Eurasia with their domesticated animals provided a vector for the rapid transmission of diseases. Inhabitants of lands with few domesticated species were never exposed to the same range of diseases, and so, at least on the American continents, succumbed to diseases introduced from Eurasia. These effects were exhaustively discussed in William McNeill's book Plagues and Peoples.

The 2001 Harvard study mentions high infant mortality as another factor; since birth rates usually increase in compensation, women may delay their entry into the workforce to care for their younger children. The education of the surviving children then becomes difficult, perpetuating a cycle of poverty.

Other

In "Climate and Scale in Economic Growth," William A. Masters and Margaret S. McMillan of Purdue University and Tufts University hypothesize that the disparity is partially due to the effects of frost in increasing soil fertility.
Hernando Zuleta, of the Universidad del Rosario, has proposed that where output fluctuations are more profound, i.e. areas that experience winter, saving is more pronounced, which leads to the adoption or creation of capital-intensive technologies.
Daron Acemoglu, Simon Johnson, and James A. Robinson of MIT argued in 2001 that in places where Europeans faced high mortality rates, they could not settle and were more likely to set up exploitative institutions. These institutions offered no protection for private property or checks and balances against government expropriation. They assert that after controlling for the effect of institutions, countries in Africa or those closer to the equator do not have lower incomes.  This work has been disputed by David Albouy, who argues that European mortality rates in the study were badly mismeasured, falsely supporting its conclusion.
The authors of "Brain size, cranial morphology, climate, and time machines" assert that colder climates increase brain size, resulting in an intelligence differential.

Impact of global warming on wealth

In a 2006 paper discussing the potential impact of global warming on wealth, John K. Horowitz of the University of Maryland predicted that a 2-degree Fahrenheit temperature increase across all countries would cause a decrease of 2 to 6 percent in world GDP, with a best estimate of around 3.5 percent.The former United Nations Secretary-General Ban Ki-moon had expressed concern that global warming will exacerbate the existing poverty in Africa.

See also
North-South divide
Land (economics)
List of countries by GDP (nominal)
Development geography
Measures of national income and output
Tropical disease

References

Further reading
Jared Diamond: Guns, Germs, and Steel: The Fates of Human Societies. W.W. Norton & Company, March 1997. 
Iain Hay: Geographies of the Super-rich. Edward Elgar. 2013 
Iain Hay and Jonathan Beaverstock: Handbook on Wealth and the Super-rich. Edward Elgar  
Theil, Henri, and Dongling Chen, "The Equatorial Grand Canyon," De Economist (1995). Abstract at 
University of Texas at El Paso. Economic Geography: Lecture 21
Sachs, Jeffrey D., Andrew D. Mellinger, and John L. Gallup. 2001. The Geography of Poverty and Wealth. Scientific American. March 2001.
McNeill, William H. Plagues and People. New York: Anchor Books, 1976. . Reprinted with new preface 1998.

Distribution of wealth
Wealth
Wealth